Richard Bray (born March 1, 1934) is an American politician who served as a Republican member of the Indiana Senate, representing Senate District 37, which includes all or parts of Morgan, Owen, Putnam, Clay, Johnson and Monroe counties.  Bray was first elected to the Indiana Senate in 1992, and served in the Senate until 2012, when he was succeeded by his son, Rodric Bray. He also served in the Indiana House of Representatives from 1974 to 1992 and as the Morgan County Prosecuting Attorney from 1958 to 1970.

Bray served as the Assistant Majority Caucus Chair and chaired the Senate Judiciary Committee.  He also served as the Ranking Member of the Commission on the Courts.

Born in Indianapolis, Indiana, Bray is the son of former member of the United States House of Representatives, William G. Bray. Bray holds AB and JD degrees from Indiana University and practices law in Martinsville, Indiana.

References

External links 
Senator Bray's home page

Living people
1934 births
Politicians from Indianapolis
People from Martinsville, Indiana